The Valerianaceae Batsch, the valerian family, was a family of flowering plants that is now considered part of the Caprifoliaceae. Plants are generally herbaceous, and their foliage often has a strong, disagreeable odor. They are found native in most regions of the world except for Australia. Some species are cultivated as ornamentals or used in herbal medicine for inducing relaxation and sleep.

The genera that were placed in this family, along with some species, include:

 Centranthus
 C. ruber (red valerian, spur valerian or red spur valerian)

 Fedia
 F. cornucopiae (African valerian, horn of plenty)

 Nardostachys
 N. jatamansi (Spikenard)
 N. chinensis

 Patrinia
 Plectritis
 Valeriana
 V. dioica (marsh valerian)
 V. officinalis (garden valerian)

 Valerianella
 V. locusta (corn salad, lamb's lettuce)

References

Bell, C. D. 2004. Valerianaceae. The Tree of Life Web Project.
Bell, C. D. 2004. Preliminary phylogeny of Valerianaceae (Dipsacales) based on nuclear and chloroplast DNA sequence data. Molecular Phylogenetics & Evolution 31:340-350.
Jepson Manual Treatment for Valerianaceae Jepson Online Interchange, Jepson Flora Project.

Dipsacales
Historically recognized angiosperm families